Shila was Patriarch of the Church of the East from 503 to 523.  He is included in the traditional list of patriarchs of the Church of the East.

Sources 
Brief accounts of Shila's reign are given in the Ecclesiastical Chronicle of the Jacobite writer Bar Hebraeus (floruit 1280) and in the ecclesiastical histories of the Nestorian writers Mari (twelfth-century), Amr (fourteenth-century) and Sliba (fourteenth-century).  His life is also covered in the Chronicle of Seert.

Modern assessments of his patriarchate can be found in Wigram's Introduction to the History of the Assyrian Church and David Wilmshurst's The Martyred Church.

Shila's patriarchate 
The following account of Shila's reign is given by Bar Hebraeus:

Babai died after five years in office, and his successor was Shila, whose name is derived from the Hebrew word 'question'.  This man had both a wife and sons and daughters, and he was a proud man besides, who loved luxuries and money and was under the thumb of his wife.  He gave his daughter in marriage to a certain doctor named Elisha, and ordered that his son-in-law Elisha should be appointed catholicus after him; but the priest Mari opposed him.  Shila died after a while in office.

See also
 List of patriarchs of the Church of the East

Notes

References
 Abbeloos, J. B., and Lamy, T. J., Bar Hebraeus, Chronicon Ecclesiasticum (3 vols, Paris, 1877)
 Assemani, J. A., De Catholicis seu Patriarchis Chaldaeorum et Nestorianorum (Rome, 1775)
 Brooks, E. W., Eliae Metropolitae Nisibeni Opus Chronologicum (Rome, 1910)
 Gismondi, H., Maris, Amri, et Salibae: De Patriarchis Nestorianorum Commentaria I: Amri et Salibae Textus (Rome, 1896)
 Gismondi, H., Maris, Amri, et Salibae: De Patriarchis Nestorianorum Commentaria II: Maris textus arabicus et versio Latina (Rome, 1899)
 
 
Wilmshurst, David, The Martyred Church: A History of the Church of the East (London, 2011).

External links 

Patriarchs of the Church of the East
6th-century bishops of the Church of the East
Christians in the Sasanian Empire
6th-century Iranian people
532 deaths